These are lists of Swedish county governors.

 List of governors of Älvsborg County
 List of governors of Blekinge County
 List of governors of Dalarna County
 List of governors of Gävleborg County
 List of governors of Gothenburg and Bohus County
 List of governors of Gotland County
 List of governors of Halland County
 List of governors of Jämtland County
 List of governors of Jönköping County
 List of governors of Kalmar County
 List of governors of Kristianstad County
 List of governors of Kronoberg County
 List of governors of Malmöhus County
 List of governors of Norrbotten County
 List of governors of Örebro County
 List of governors of Östergötland County
 List of governors of Skåne County
 List of governors of Skaraborg County
 List of governors of Södermanland County
 List of governors of Stockholm County
 List of governors of Uppsala County
 List of governors of Värmland County
 List of governors of Västerbotten County
 List of governors of Västernorrland County
 List of governors of Västmanland County
 List of governors of Västra Götaland County